Freddy Alejandro Oncoy Huarote (born 29 September 2000) is a Peruvian footballer who plays as a midfielder for Peruvian Primera División side Binacional.

Club career

Sport Boys
Oncoy was promoted to the first team squad in the summer 2018 at the age of 17. He got his official debut for Sport Boys on 28 October 2018 against Carlos A. Mannucci. Oncoy started on the bench, before replacing Luis Magallanes in the 58th minute. Oncoy made a total of 4 appearances for Sport Boys in the 2019 Torneo Descentralizado season.

International career
Oncoy made two appearances for Peru U17 in the 2017 South American U-17 Championship against Brazil U17 and Argentina U17. He also played in a friendly game against Bolivia U17.

References

External links
 
 

Living people
2000 births
Association football midfielders
Peruvian footballers
Peru youth international footballers
Peruvian Primera División players
Sport Boys footballers
FBC Melgar footballers
People from Lima Region